Shaun Reynolds may refer to:
 Shaun Reynolds (musician), English musician
 Shaun Reynolds (rugby union) (born 1995), South African rugby union player